Min Phaungga was viceroy of Toungoo (Taungoo) from 1383 to 1397.

Brief
According to the regional chronicle Toungoo Yazawin, he was a commoner born in Phaungga, a village near then capital Pinya. His personal name is unknown. The name he is known by "Min Phaungga" simply means Lord from Phaungga. He later moved to Toungoo (Taungoo) where he served in the regional administration there, rising to become a senior official by the early 1380s in the administration of Viceroy Sokkate.

In 1383, Phaungga assassinated Sokkate, who did not have a good relationship with his overlord King Swa Saw Ke of Ava. (Sokkate himself had come to power by assassinating his brother-in-law Pyanchi II four years earlier). Phaungga quickly submitted to Swa Saw Ke, who in turn appointed Phaungga viceroy. Phaungga also sent a diplomatic mission to King Binnya U of Hanthawaddy.

Despite his mission to Pegu (Bago), he contributed to his overlord Swa's war effort against Hanthawaddy (1385–1391), which ended in an uneasy truce. His frontier state did not see any more wars except for occasional raids from eastern Shan states. Toungoo Yazawin states that he was en route to Ava (Inwa) to attend a royal conference, and had to rush back to Toungoo because of a Shan incursion. He repaired and constructed several irrigation works, and built new settlements around Toungoo to house increased population. He died in 1397, and was succeeded by his son Saw Oo.

Notes

References

Bibliography
 
 
 

Ava dynasty